Deerbrook is an unincorporated community in Noxubee County, in the U.S. state of Mississippi.

History
A post office was established as "Deer Brook" in 1842.  The name was changed to "Deerbrook" in 1856, and the post office was discontinued in 1942.

Deerbrook had a population of 66 by 1900.  The settlement was described as having "two stores, and a fine cotton gin."

Notable people
Chemist Charles Baskerville was born in Deerbrook.

References

Unincorporated communities in Noxubee County, Mississippi
Unincorporated communities in Mississippi